Pterolophia latipennis is a species of beetle in the family Cerambycidae. It was described by Maurice Pic in 1938.

References

latipennis
Beetles described in 1938